The 2019 Pittsburgh Panthers women's soccer team represented University of Pittsburgh during the 2019 NCAA Division I women's soccer season.  The Panthers are led by head coach Randy Waldrum, in his second season.  They play home games at Ambrose Urbanic Field.  This is the team's 24th season playing organized men's college soccer and their 7th playing in the Atlantic Coast Conference.

The Panthers finished the season 5–10–3 overall, and 2–6–2 in ACC play to finish in tenth place.  They did not qualify for the ACC Tournament and were not invited to the NCAA Tournament.

Squad

Roster

Updated July 23, 2020

Team management

Source:

Schedule

Source:

|-
!colspan=6 style=""| Exhibition

|-
!colspan=6 style=""| Non-Conference Regular season

|-
!colspan=6 style=""| ACC Regular season

Rankings

References

Pittsburgh
Pittsburgh Panthers women's soccer seasons
2019 in sports in Pennsylvania